Koutha is a village in Aurad taluka of Bidar district in the South Indian state of Karnataka. 

Kowtha (buzurg) is a village in Boath mandal of Adilabad district of Telangana state 

Villages in Bidar district